Spotted fever rickettsiosis, also known as spotted fever group rickettsia (SFGR), is a group of infections that include Rocky Mountain spotted fever, Rickettsia parkeri rickettsiosis, Pacific Coast tick fever, and rickettsialpox. The group of infections was created in 2010 as they are difficult to tell apart.

References

Rickettsioses
Bacterium-related cutaneous conditions
Zoonoses
Tick-borne diseases